Brij Mahotsav is a festival that is celebrated for three days in Shukla paksha of Phalgun. It is celebrated in the Brij region, located in the Bharatpur district, Rajasthan in the month of March. Held in honour of Lord Krishna, this festival is marked by verve and zest. Villagers, in gay, multicoloured attire, can be seen singing and performing the Raslila dance (dance depicting the immortal love-story of Radha and Krishna). All of Bharatpur echoes the sound of folk melodies on this festival held on the eve of Holi.

History and location 
Bharatpur lies close to Braj Bhoomi the birthplace of Lord Krishna and where he spent his childhood. The Raas Leela, depicting the life of Krishna, is performed by professionals selected by the Rai community for this occasion. Bharatpur is well connected by road and rail with Delhi, Jaipur, Agra and other cities and towns of North India. Bharatpur is situated on the Delhi - Mumbai main railway line and also on National Highway no. 11. The nearest airport is in Agra (56 km).

References 

Hindu festivals in India
Brij